St George's Church, Church of St George, or variants thereof, may refer to various churches dedicated to Saint George:

Albania
 St. George's Church, Dardhë

Armenia
 Saint Gevork Monastery of Mughni, St. George's Monastery of Mughni

Australia
 St. George's Anglican Church, Battery Point, Tasmania
 St George's Anglican Church, Beenleigh, Queensland
 St George's Church, Gawler, South Australia; designed by Edward Hamilton
 St. George's Church, Malvern, Victoria
 St George the Martyr Church and Parish Hall, Queenscliff, Victoria

Austria

Belgium 
 Saint George's Memorial Church, Ypres

Bosnia and Herzegovina
Church of St. George, Sopotnica

Bulgaria
 Church of Saint George, Sofia
 Church of St George, Kyustendil

Canada
 St. George's Anglican Church (Montreal)
 St. George's (Round) Church (Halifax, Nova Scotia)
 St George's Church (Ottawa)

Croatia
 Church of St. George, Kneževo

Cyprus
 Sourp Kevork Church, Limassol (Armenian Apostolic)
 Church of St. George of the Greeks, Famagusta

Czech Republic
 St. George's Convent, Prague
 St. George's Basilica, Prague

Egypt
 Church of St. George (Cairo) (Greek Orthodox)
 Church of Saint George (Sohag), Sohag

Ethiopia
 Church of Saint George, Lalibela
 Yelet Giorgis Church, Bulga

Finland
, Mariehamn

France
Église Saint-Georges de Lyon
Église Saint-Georges de Châtenois
St. George's Church, Haguenau
St. George's Church, Sélestat
St. George's Church, Vesoul
Royal Memorial Church of St George, Cannes

Georgia (country)
St. George's Church, one of the churches in Kintsvisi Monastery

Germany
St. Georg, Aplerbeck
St. George's Anglican Church, Berlin
Berger Kirche, dedicated to St. George, in Brechen
St. George's Church, Cologne
St. George's Abbey, Isny
St. George's Collegiate Church, Tübingen, the Stiftskirche

Greece
 St. George's Church in the Old Fortress, Corfu
 St. George's Church (Rotunda), part of the Arch of Galerius and Rotunda, Thessaloniki

India
 St. George Orthodox Church, Cheppad
 St. George Basilica, Angamaly
 St. George Orthodox Church, Puthuppally
 Kottoor Pally, Kolenchery
 St. George's Church, Chandanapally
 St. George's Church, Hyderabad
 St. George's Forane Church, Edappally, Kerala, South India

Iran
 St. George Church, Salmas
 St. George Church, New Julfa, Isfahan
 St. George Church, Tehran

Iraq 
 St. George's Church, Ankawa

Ireland
 Old Church of St George, Hill Street Dublin
 St. George's Church, Dublin

Isle of Man
 St George's Church, Isle of Man

Israel and disputed territories
 Church of Saint George, Abu Snan, Galilee (Greek Orthodox)
 Church of Saint George, Acre (Greek Orthodox)
 Church of Saint George, I'billin, Galilee (Greek Orthodox)
 Church of Saint George, Jaffa (Greek Orthodox)
 Church of Saint George, Lod (Greek Orthodox)
 St. George's Monastery, Al-Khader near Bethlehem, West Bank (Greek Orthodox)
 St. George's Monastery, Wadi Qelt near Jericho, West Bank (Greek Orthodox)

Italy
 San Giorgio fuori le mura
 San Giorgio in Velabro

Kazakhstan
St George's Church, Kokshetau

Lebanon
 Maronite Cathedral of Saint George, Beirut
 Saint George Greek Orthodox Cathedral
 Cathedral of Saint George, Ehden
 Saint George Monastery, Deir el-Harf
 Saint George Church, Baabdat
 Saint George Church, Edde
 Church of Saint George, Faitroun, Keserwan District, Mount Lebanon
 Saint Georges, Saraaine El Tahta in Bekaa Valley
 Saint George Church , Zouk Mikael, Keserwan District, Mount Lebanon
 Triple Church of St. George, Tabarja
 Saint George, Bteghrine

Malta
St George's Chapel, Birżebbuġa
Parish Church of St George, Qormi 
St. George's Basilica, Malta 
Church of St George, Valletta

Malaysia
 St. George's Church, Penang

North Macedonia
Church of St. George, Staro Nagoričane

Norway
 St George's Church, Bergen, St. Jørgen's hospitalkirken in Bergen

Palestine
 St. George's Monastery, Al-Khader, al-Khader, Bethlehem
 Burqin Church or St. George's Church, Burqin, Jenin
 St. George's Cathedral, Jerusalem
 St. George's Monastery in Wadi Qelt, Jericho 
 St. George's Greek Orthodox Church, Jifna, Ramallah
 St. George's Greek Orthodox Church, Birzeit, Ramallah
 St George church ruins, Taybeh, Ramallah
 St. George's Greek Orthodox Church, Tulkarm

Portugal
 St. George's Church, Lisbon, the English-speaking Anglican congregation in Lisbon

Romania
New St. George Church, Bucharest
Old St. George Church, Bucharest 
St. George's Church, Caransebeș
North St. George Church, Focșani
Armenian Church, Focșani
South Cemetery Church, Focșani
St. George's Church, Mangalia
St. George's Church, Sfântu Gheorghe

Russia
St. George's Church, Staraya Ladoga

Serbia
Church of St. George, Lukovo
St. George's Church, Oplenac
Church of St. George, Staro Nagoričane

Singapore
Saint George's Church, Singapore

Syria
Saint George's Monastery, Homs

Turkey
St. George's Church, Diyarbakır
Church of St. George, Istanbul

Ukraine 
 St. George's Church, Drohobych

United Kingdom

England

Bedfordshire
St George's Church, Edworth

Berkshire
St George's Chapel, Windsor Castle

Bristol
St George's Church, Brandon Hill

Cambridgeshire
St George's Church, Little Thetford

Cheshire
St George's Church, Macclesfield
St George's Church, Poynton

Cumbria
St George's Church, Barrow-in-Furness
Church of Holy Trinity and St George, Kendal
St George's Church, Kendal
St George's Church, Millom

Devon
St George's Church, Morebath
St George's Church, Tiverton

Dorset

 St George's Church, Fordington
 St George's Church, Langham
 St George's Church, Oakdale
 St George's Church, Portland

East Sussex
St George's Church, Brighton
St George's Church, Polegate

Gloucestershire
St George's Church, Gloucester

Greater Manchester
St George's Church, Altrincham
St George's Church, Carrington
St George's Church, Heaviley
St George's Church, Hyde
Church of St George, Chester Road, Hulme
St George's Church, Stalybridge

Isle of Wight 
St George's Church, Arreton

Kent
St George's Chapel, Chatham
St George's Church, Gravesend, burial site of Pocahontas

Lancashire
St George's Church, Chorley
Church of St George the Martyr, Preston

Lincolnshire
St George's Church, Goltho
St George's Church, Stamford

London
St George's RAF Chapel, Biggin Hill
St George's Church, Beckenham
St George's, Bloomsbury
St George's Church, Hanworth
St George's, Hanover Square
St George in the East
St George the Martyr, Holborn
St George the Martyr, Southwark
St George's Cathedral, London
St George's Cathedral, Southwark
St George's Interdenominational Chapel, Heathrow Airport

Merseyside
St George's Church, Everton
St George's Church on the site of the Liverpool Castle
St George's Church, Thornton Hough

Norfolk
St George's Church, Colegate, Norwich
St George's Church, Tombland, Norwich
St George's Church, Shimpling

North Tyneside
St George's, Cullercoats

Nottinghamshire
St George's Church, Barton in Fabis
St George in the Meadows, Nottingham

Somerset
St George's Church, Beckington
St George's Church, Bicknoller
Priory Church of St George, Dunster
Church of St George, Easton in Gordano
St George's Church, Fons George
St George's Church, Hinton St George

Surrey
St George's Church, Esher

West Midlands
St George's Church, Edgbaston

West Sussex
St George's Church, Eastergate
St George's Church, Worthing

Wiltshire
St George's Church, Orcheston

Worcestershire
St George's Church, Worcester

Yorkshire
Minster and Parish Church of St George, Doncaster, South Yorkshire
St George's Church, Leeds, West Yorkshire
St George's Church, Portobello, Sheffield
St George's Roman Catholic Church, York

Northern Ireland
St George's Church, Belfast

Scotland
St Andrew's and St George's West Church, Edinburgh
St George's Tron Church, Glasgow
St Paul's and St George's Church, Edinburgh

United States
St. George's Catholic Church (Chicago), a defunct Lithuanian-Catholic church
St. George's Church (Leadville, Colorado), in National Historic Landmark Leadville Historic District
St. George's Chapel, Lewes, Delaware
Saint Georges, Delaware
North Saint Georges Historic District
St. Georges Presbyterian Church
St. George Episcopal Church (Jacksonville), Florida
Greek Orthodox Church of St. George (Des Moines, Iowa), listed on the National Register of Historic Places
St. George's Episcopal Church (Le Mars, Iowa), NRHP-listed
St. George's Roman Catholic Church (Louisville), Kentucky
St. George's Episcopal Church (Austin, Nevada), NRHP-listed
St. George's Anglican Church (Helmetta, New Jersey), NHRP district contributing property
St. George & St. Shenouda Coptic Orthodox Church (Jersey City, New Jersey)
St. George Coptic Orthodox Church (Brooklyn), New York
St. George's Church (Queens), New York
St. George's Episcopal Church (Hempstead, New York)
St. George's Episcopal Church (Manhattan), New York
Saint George Ukrainian Catholic Church, Manhattan, New York
St. George's Catholic Church (Cincinnati, Ohio), NRHP-listed
St. George Coptic Orthodox Church, Norristown, Pennsylvania
St. George's United Methodist Church (Philadelphia), Pennsylvania
St. George's Catholic Church (Bakersfield, Vermont), NRHP-listed
St. George's Church (Pungoteague, Virginia), Accomack County, Virginia
St. George's Episcopal Church (Fredericksburg, Virginia)

See also 
Saint George
St. George and St. Adalbert Church, Sillamäe, Estonia
St. George's Anglican Church (disambiguation)
St. George's Cathedral (disambiguation)